Dr. Abdallah Saleh Possi (born 25 August 1979) is a Tanzanian politician who serves as Tanzania's Ambassador to Germany. He is also accredited to Austria, Bulgaria, Czech Republic, the Holy See, Hungary, Poland, Romania, and Switzerland.
Before being appointed to serve as an Ambassador, Dr. Possi served as a Member of Parliament and the Deputy Minister of State in the Prime Minister's Office responsible for Persons with Disability. Previously, he worked as a lecturer at the University of Dodoma in Tanzania; and practiced as an Advocate of the High Court of Tanzania. He had also worked as a tutor at the Institute of Judicial Administration in Lushoto, Tanga, Tanzania. He holds LL.B. and LL.M. from the University of Dar es Salaam (Tanzania), and a Dr. phil. from the University of Erlangen–Nuremberg in Germany. Dr. Possi is married and has three children.

Works
 POSSI, A. (2018) ‘Integrating Persons with Disabilities in the East African Labour Market A Comparative Analysis of Employment and Disability Laws in Tanzania, Kenya and Uganda’, in J. DÖVELING et al. (eds), Harmonisation of Laws in the East African Community: the State of Affairs with Comparative Insights from the European Union and other Regional Economic Communities, 5 TGCL Series, 213–242.
 POSSI, A. & POSSI, A. ‘The identity Question versus Appropriateness of legal Anti-discrimination Measures: Endorsing the Disability Rights Approach to Albinism’, African Disability Rights Yearbook, 5 (2017), 118 -140. http://www.adry.up.ac.za/index.php/section-a-articles-2017/abdallah-possi-ally-possi
 POSSI, A. ‘Implementing Article 33 of the CRPD: Tanzanian approach’, African Disability Rights Yearbook, 4 (2016), 191–210. http://www.adry.up.ac.za/index.php/section-a-articles-4-2016/abdallah-possi
 POSSI, A. ‘Relating Equality and Disability Approaches in Tanzania: The Law in Tanzania Mainland and Zanzibar’, Zanzibar Yearbook of Law, 5 (2015), 3 – 29. http://www.zlsc.or.tz/documents/VOLUME%205.pdf
 POSSI, A. ‘Criminal Justice in Disrepute: An Overview of Treatment of Accused Persons and Convicts in Tanzania’, The Open University Law Journal, 1/1 (2007), 83–97.

References

External links
 http://www.foreign.go.tz/
 http://www.botschafter-berlin.de/tansania/

1979 births
Living people
People from Dar es Salaam
People with albinism
Ambassadors of Tanzania to Germany
Chama Cha Mapinduzi MPs
Nominated Tanzanian MPs
21st-century Tanzanian lawyers
University of Erlangen-Nuremberg alumni
University of Dar es Salaam alumni